Vyacheslav Dmitriyevich Grulyov (born 23 March 1999) is a Russian football player who plays as a forward for FC Dynamo Moscow. His primary position is a striker and he is also deployed as a left winger.

Club career
He made his debut in the Russian Professional Football League for FC Dynamo-2 Moscow on 20 July 2016 in a game against FC Tekstilshchik Ivanovo.

He made his Russian Premier League debut for FC Dynamo Moscow on 4 March 2018 in a game against FC Ufa. On 30 November 2018, he scored his first Premier League goal for Dynamo, a late equalizer in a 1–1 away draw against FC Rubin Kazan. On 3 March 2019, he scored his second goal which gave Dynamo a 2–1 away victory over FC Ufa in the added time.

On 10 January 2020, he joined FC Nizhny Novgorod on loan until the end of the season.

On 16 May 2021, the closing day of the 2020–21 season, he scored twice after coming on as a second-half substitute in a 3–2 victory over PFC CSKA Moscow.

On 22 December 2021, he extended his Dynamo contract to 2025.

Career statistics

References

External links
 
 Profile by Russian Professional Football League

1999 births
Living people
People from Kemerovo
Sportspeople from Kemerovo Oblast
Russian footballers
Russia youth international footballers
Russia under-21 international footballers
Association football midfielders
FC Dynamo Moscow players
FC Nizhny Novgorod (2015) players
Russian Premier League players
Russian First League players
Russian Second League players